Paytm Payments Bank (PPBL) is an Indian payments bank, founded in 2015 and headquartered in Noida and is part of mobile payment company paytm. In the same year, it received the license to run a payments bank from the Reserve Bank of India  and was launched in November 2017. In 2021, the bank received a scheduled bank status from the RBI.

Vijay Shekhar Sharma holds 51 per cent in the entity with One97 Communications holding 49 per cent . Vijay Shekhar Sharma is the  promoter of Paytm Payments Bank, and One97 Communications Limited is not categorized as one of its promoters.

History 
In 2015, Paytm Payments Bank Limited had received in-principle approval from the Reserve Bank of India to set up a payments bank and was formally inaugurated on November 28, 2017.

In the financial year 2020, the bank facilitated more than 485 crore transactions worth ₹4.6 lakh crore. It processed over 778 million UPI transactions amounting to ₹89,388 crore in June 2022  and continues to be India’s biggest UPI beneficiary bank  with over 1,370 million digital transactions in June 2022. 

In March 2021, the bank received approval for its @Paytm UPI handle from the Securities and Exchange Board of India   for issuing payment mandates for initial public offerings (IPOs) through the Unified Payments Interface (UPI).

Products and services 
Paytm Payments Bank offers savings and current accounts with a debit card, facilitating fast and easy payments.
Paytm Payments Bank has issued seven million Visa debit cards through its platform in FY'21.

Partnership 
In January 2018, Paytm Payments Bank partnered with IndusInd Bank to offer fixed deposits. It entered into a partnership with MasterCard for the issuance of virtual and physical debit cards in April 2020. In January 2021, it tied up with Suryoday Small Finance Bank to offer fixed deposit services to its account holders. Since June 2021, it is not providing new fixed deposit creation with Suryodaya Bank.

Financials 
Paytm Payments Bank reported a ₹19 crore profit for the financial year 2018-2019, making it the first payments bank in India to become profitable. The company registered a profit of ₹29.8 crore for the financial year 2020.

Legal challenges 
In June 2018, the Reserve Bank of India barred Paytm Payment Bank from opening new customer accounts, following an audit by the Reserve Bank of India, which made some observations about the process the company follows in acquiring new customers and its adherence to KYC norms. However, in January 2019, it received approval from the RBI to resume on-boarding new customers. In October 2021, RBI imposed a fine of ₹1 crore on the bank for violating laws pertaining to payments and settlement. On 11 March 2022, RBI prohibited PPBL from on-boarding new customers owing to "certain material supervisory concerns observed in the bank".

Awards and recognition 
 In September 2021, Paytm Payments Bank was awarded the ASSOCHAM's FinTech & Digital Payments Award 2021 in the category of Excellence in Payments by the Associated Chambers of Commerce and Industry of India.
 It was awarded the ETBFSI Excellence Award under the category 'Best Digital Bank of the Year' by The Economic Times in 2020. 
 It won the Finacle Client Innovation Award, 2020 for the category of Ecosystem-led Innovation by Infosys.
 In October 2019, Paytm Payments Bank received the Digital Payments Award for outstanding performance from the Government of India. The award was presented by Ravi Shankar Prasad, the Minister of Communication, Electronics & IT and Law & Justice, at the 2019 MeitY Start-up Summit.
 It won  the Infosys Finacle Client Innovation Award under categories such as process innovation, innovative custom components and product innovation in 2019.
 It also won with Celent Model Bank 2019 Award.
 The company was awarded the RBI Asia Trailblazer Award by Retail Banker International in 2019.
 In 2018, the National Payments Corporation of India (NPCI) recognized the company with Excellent Award 2018 for excellent performance for High Acceptance of Rupay card for E-Comm Transaction & Excellent performance in Aadhaar Enabled Payment System (AePS).

See also 

 Jio Payments Bank
 India Post Payments Bank
 Aditya Birla Payments Bank

References

External links 
 

Payments banks
Banks established in 2015
Online payments
Indian brands
Privately held companies of India
Indian companies established in 2015
2015 establishments in Uttar Pradesh